This is a list of law enforcement agencies in the U.S. state of Oregon.

According to the US Bureau of Justice Statistics' 2008 Census of State and Local Law Enforcement Agencies, the state had 174 law enforcement agencies employing 6,695 sworn police officers, about 177 for each 100,000 residents.

State agencies 
 Oregon Board of Parole and Post-Prison Supervision
 Oregon Department of Corrections
 Oregon Department of Justice
 Oregon Department of Transportation Motor Carrier Enforcement
 Oregon Liquor and Cannabis Commission
 Oregon State Police
 Oregon State Fire Marshal
 Oregon Youth Authority

County agencies 

 Baker County Sheriff's Office
 Benton County Sheriff's Office
 Clackamas County Sheriff's Office
 Clatsop County Sheriff's Office
 Columbia County Sheriff's Office
 Coos County Sheriff's Office
 Crook County Sheriff's Office
 Curry County Sheriff's Office
 Deschutes County Sheriff's Office
 Douglas County Sheriff's Office
 Gilliam County Sheriff's Office
 Grant County Sheriff's Office

 Harney County Sheriff's Office
 Hood River County Sheriff's Office
 Jackson County Sheriff's Office
 Jefferson County Sheriff's Office
 Josephine County Sheriff's Office
 Klamath County Sheriff's Office
 Lake County Sheriff's Office
 Lane County Sheriff's Office
 Lincoln County Sheriff's Office
 Linn County Sheriff's Office
 Malheur County Sheriff's Office
 Marion County Sheriff's Office

 Morrow County Sheriff's Office
 Multnomah County Sheriff's Office
 Polk County Sheriff's Office
 Sherman County Sheriff's Office
 Tillamook County Sheriff's Office
 Umatilla County Sheriff's Office
 Union County Sheriff's Office
 Wallowa County Sheriff's Office
 Wasco County Sheriff's Office
 Washington County Sheriff's Office
 Wheeler County Sheriff's Office
 Yamhill County Sheriff's Office

City agencies 

 Adair Village Police Department
 Albany Police Department
 Amity Police Department
 Ashland Police Department
 Astoria Police Department
 Athena Police Department
 Aumsville Police Department
 Baker City Police Department
 Bandon Police Department
 Beaverton Police Department
 Bend Police Department
 Black Butte Ranch Police Department
 Boardman Police Department
 Brookings Police Department
 Burns Police Department
 Butte Falls Police Department
 Canby Police Department
 Cannon Beach Police Department
 Carlton Police Department
 Central Point Police Department
 Clatskanie Police Department
 Coburg Police Department
 Columbia City Police Department
 Condon Police Department
 Coos Bay Police Department
 Coquille Police Department
 Cornelius Police Department
 Corvallis Police Department
 Cottage Grove Police Department
 Dallas Police Department (Oregon)
 Eagle Point Police Department
 Enterprise Police Department
 Eugene Police Department
 Fairview Police Department
 Florence Police Department
 Forest Grove Police Department
 Gearhart Police Department
 Gervais Police Department
 Gladstone Police Department
 Gold Beach Police Department
 Grants Pass Department of Public Safety
 Gresham Police Department

 Hermiston Police Department
 Hillsboro Police Department
 Hines Police Department
 Hood River Police Department
 Hubbard Police Department
 Independence Police Department
 Jacksonville Police Department
 John Day Police Department
 Junction City Police Department
 Keizer Police Department
 King City Police Department
 Klamath Falls Police Department
 La Grande Police Department
 Lake Oswego Police Department
 Lakeview Police Department
 Lebanon Police Department
 Lincoln City Police Department
 Madras Police Department
 Malin Police Department
 Manzanita Police Department
 McMinnville Police Department
 Medford Police Department
 Merrill Police Department
 Milton-Freewater Police Department
 Milwaukie Police Department
 Molalla Police Department
 Monmouth Police Department
 Mt. Angel Police Department
 Myrtle Creek Police Department
 Myrtle Point Police Department
 Newberg-Dundee Police Department
 Newport Police Department
 North Bend Police Department
 North Plains Police Department
 Nyssa Police Department
 Oakland Police Department
 Oakridge Police Department
 Ontario Police Department
 Oregon City Police Department
 Pendleton Police Department
 Philomath Police Department
 Phoenix Police Department

 Pilot Rock Police Department
 Port Orford Police Department
 Portland Police Bureau
 Powers Police Department
 Prairie City Police Department
 Prineville Police Department
 Rainier Police Department
 Redmond Police Department
 Reedsport Police Department
 Rockaway Beach Police Department
 Rogue River Police Department
 Roseburg Police Department
 Salem Police Department
 Sandy Police Department
 Scappoose Police Department
 Seaside Police Department
 Sherwood Police Department
 Silverton Police Department
 Springfield Police Department
 St. Helens Police Department
 Stanfield Police Department
 Stayton Police Department
 Sunriver Police Department
 Sutherlin Police Department
 Sweet Home Police Department
 Talent Police Department
 The Dalles Police Department
 Tigard Police Department
 Tillamook Police Department
 Toledo Police Department
 Troutdale Police Department
 Tualatin Police Department
 Turner Police Department
 Umatilla Police Department
 Vernonia Police Department
 Warrenton Police Department
 West Linn Police Department
 Weston Police Department
 Winston Police Department
 Woodburn Police Department
 Yamhill Police Department

Tribal agencies

Burns Paiute Tribal Police Department
Coquille Indian Tribal Police Department
Columbia River Inter-Tribal Fisheries Enforcement Department
Confederated Tribes of Coos, Lower Umpqua and Siuslaw Indians Police Department

Confederated Tribes of Grand Ronde Tribal Police
Umatilla Tribal Police Department
Warm Springs Tribal Police Department

College and University agencies
See also Campus Law Enforcement in Oregon

 Blue Mountain Community College Department of Public Safety
 Central Oregon Community College Department of Public Safety
 Chemeketa Community College Department of Public Safety
 Clackamas Community College Department of Public Safety
 Clatsop Community College Department of Public Safety
 Columbia Gorge Community College Department of Public Safety
 Klamath Community College Department of Public Safety
 Lane Community College Department of Public Safety
 Linn-Benton Community College Department of Public Safety
 Mt. Hood Community College Department of Public Safety
 Oregon Coast Community College Department of Public Safety

 Oregon Health and Science University Police
 Portland Community College Department of Public Safety
 Portland State University Office of Campus Safety
 Rogue Community College Department of Public Safety
 Southern Oregon University Campus Public Safety
 Southwestern Oregon Community College Department of Public Safety
 Tillamook Bay Community College Department of Public Safety
 Treasure Valley Community College Department of Public Safety
 Umpqua Community College Department of Public Safety
 University of Oregon Police Department
 Western Oregon University Department of Public Safety

Other Special District Agencies

 Port of Portland Police Department

 Portland Transit Police

Lane Transit District Public Safety

Uniformed Federal Agencies in Oregon
See also Federal Law Enforcement in the United States

  U.S. Department of Agriculture
  United States Forest Service
  U.S. Department of Commerce
  National Oceanic and Atmospheric Administration Fisheries Office of Law Enforcement
  U.S. Department of Homeland Security
  Federal Protective Service
  Transportation Security Administration
 United States Coast Guard

  U.S. Department of the Interior
  Bureau of Indian Affairs
(see also Tribal Agencies)
  Bureau of Land Management
  Fish and Wildlife Service
  National Park Service

 United States Department of Justice
 Office of the United States Marshal for the District of Oregon
 Department of Veterans Affairs
 VA Police, Portland
 VA Police, Roseburg

See also 

 List of lists about Oregon

References

Oregon
Law enforcement
Law enforcement agencies of Oregon